A direct-controlled municipality is the highest level classification for cities used by unitary states, with status equal to that of the provinces in the respective countries. A direct-controlled municipality is similar to, but not the same as, a federal district, a common designation in various countries for a municipality that is not part of any state, and which usually hosts some governmental functions. Usually direct-controlled municipality are under central government control with limited power.

Many countries have adopted this system with some different variations. Geographically and culturally, many of the municipalities are enclaves in the middle of provinces. Some occur in strategic positions in between provinces.

References

See also 
 Independent city
 Federal city
 Metropolitan Capitalism (Capital City)
 Federal district
 Federal territory

Municipalities
Types of administrative division